Alexander Pavlioutchenkov (born 3 December 1985) is a Russian tennis player.

Pavlioutchenkov has a career high ATP singles ranking of 704 achieved on 8 September 2003. He also has a career high doubles ranking of 258 achieved on 28 May 2018.

Pavlioutchenkov has won 1 ATP Challenger doubles title at the 2018 Fergana Challenger. He's a brother of the professional tennis player Anastasia Pavlyuchenkova (for her surname, a different transliteration system has been applied).

Tour titles

Doubles

References

External links
 
 

1985 births
Living people
Russian male tennis players
Tennis players from Moscow
Sportspeople from Samara, Russia